Onchobothriidae is a family of flatworms belonging to the order Onchoproteocephalidea.

Genera

Genera:
 Acanthobothrium Blanchard, 1848
 Acanthobothroides Brooks, 1977

References

Platyhelminthes